Tom H. Koornwinder (born 19 September 1943, in Rotterdam) is a Dutch mathematician at the Korteweg-de Vries Institute for Mathematics who introduced Koornwinder polynomials.

See also
 Askey–Bateman project

References
 Curriculum Vitae
 home page
 
 brief bio

1943 births
Living people
20th-century Dutch mathematicians
21st-century Dutch mathematicians
Leiden University alumni
University of Amsterdam alumni
Academic staff of the University of Amsterdam
Scientists from Rotterdam